Iglesia de Santa María (Llanes) is a church in Llanes, Asturias, Spain. The church was established in the 15th century.

See also
Asturian art
Catholic Church in Spain

References

Churches in Llanes
15th-century establishments in Spain
15th-century Roman Catholic church buildings in Spain